Juro Que Te Amo (English title: Oath Of Love) is a Mexican telenovela produced by Mapat L. de Zatarain for Televisa in 2008. It's a remake of Mexican telenovela 1993 Los Parientes Pobres. Telenovela is a domestic drama about a wealthy family who loses everything and finds that they were only liked for their money.

On July 28, 2008, Canal de las Estrellas started broadcasting Juro Que Te Amo weekdays at 7:00pm, replacing Tormenta en el Paraiso. The last episode was broadcast on February 6, 2009 with Verano de Amor replacing it the following day.

Ana Brenda Contreras and José Ron starred as protagonists, Patricia Navidad and Alejandro Ávila starred as co-protagonists, while Alexis Ayala, Cecilia Gabriela, Marcelo Córdoba, Florencia del Saracho, Liliana Goret and Mariana Karr starred as antagonists.

Plot 
Violeta Madrigal is a beautiful girl who lives in a provincial town, Puerta del Cielo, with her parents, Amado and Antonia, her brothers Julio and Daniel, and her sister Lia. The family was the richest in town, but after losing their fortune they realized the hypocrisy of people who previously seemed to love and respect them. They face a lot of situations that lead to the town creating and spreading rumors about their family.

Justino Fregoso is the most powerful of the Madrigal family's former friends. He made his fortune through shady deals that ended the stability of the goldsmith company previously owned by the Madrigal family and caused them to be near bankruptcy. This new situation benefits his wife Malena Fregoso, who enjoys their new rich position, and their daughter Mariela, who takes every opportunity to humiliate Violeta.

Mariano Lazcano is a wealthy man who used to live in Puerta del Cielo and left for Mexico City after suffering heartbreak. He goes on to create a successful company and marries Leonora. They share three kids: Renato, Pablo, and Ivanna. After years of not seeing Antonia, he returns to Puerta del Cielo when she needs help with her family and company.

The lives of all three families will become entangled in different situations that will lead to love, drama, and heartbreak.

Cast

Main
Ana Brenda Contreras as Violeta Madrigal Campero
Patricia Navidad as Antonia Campero Vda. de Madrigal/de Lazcano
José Ron as José María Aldama
Alejandro Ávila as Mariano Lazcano Madrigal
Pepe Gámez as Julio Madrigal Campero
Alexis Ayala as Justino Fregoso (Villano)
Lourdes Reyes as Malena de Fregoso
Florencia del Saracho as Mariela Fregoso de Cueller (Villana)
Cecilia Gabriela as Leonora Cassis Zuloaga de Lazcáno
Marcelo Córdoba as Maximiliano "Max" Cueller (Villano)
Mariana Karr as Fausta Zuloaga
Liliana Goret as Ivanna Lazcano Cassis

Supporting
 
Joana Brito as Jesusa Ponciano
Hector Sáez as Toribo
Xavier Marc as Padre Basilo Herrera
José Elías Moreno as Rogelio Urbina
Natasha Dupeyrón as Rosalía "Lía" Madrigal Campero
Jessica Coch as Cristina de Urbina
Alberto Agnesi as Renato Lazcano Cassis
Imanol Landeta as Pablo Lazcano Cassis
Osvaldo de León as Rodrigo Charolet
Claudia Godinez as Celia
Adriano Zendejas as Daniel Madrigal Campero
Sury Sadai as Coralito
Graciela Bernarndos as Adelina
Cecilia Romo as Olvido
Lorely Mancilla as Candela
Roberto Miquel as Delfino
Ariane Pellicer as Janis
Antonio Escobar as Pantaleón
Lorena Álvarez as Adelaida Lacayo
Gerardo Murguía as Celestino Charolet

Special participation
Germán Gutiérrez as Dr. Alejandro Rangel
Kelchie Arizmendi as Irma
Luis José Santander as Amado Madrigal Pereira
Francisco Rubio as Claudio Balcázar
Lizzeta Romo as Florencia
María Marcela as Sara
Óscar Ortiz de Pinedo as Osciel
Alejandra Jurado as Chona
Sergio Mayer as Producer
Mónica Garza as Gracia Lacayo
Rocío Sobrado as Nurse
Marco Muñoz as Andrés

Awards

References

External links

 at esmas.com 
Website for telemetro.com 

2008 telenovelas
Mexican telenovelas
2008 Mexican television series debuts
2009 Mexican television series endings
Spanish-language telenovelas
Television shows set in Mexico City
Televisa telenovelas